Union Station is a former railroad station at East 4th Ave. and State St. in Pine Bluff, Jefferson County, Arkansas. The station was originally at the union of the Cotton Belt and Iron Mountain railroads, and now houses the Pine Bluff/Jefferson County Historical Society museum.  It is a single-story brick building, with a hip roof whose long eaves are supported by iron columns and half-truss brackets.  The station was built in 1906 by the Iron Mountain Railroad.  It had been a stop on the St. Louis Southwestern's Lone Star (Memphis-Dallas), and also on the railway's St. Louis-Dallas trains.

Ownership reverted to the city in 1955.

The station was listed on the National Register of Historic Places in 1978.

See also

National Register of Historic Places listings in Jefferson County, Arkansas

References

External links
 Pine Bluff/Jefferson County Historical Society

Pine Bluff
History museums in Arkansas
Museums in Jefferson County, Arkansas
National Register of Historic Places in Pine Bluff, Arkansas
Railway stations on the National Register of Historic Places in Arkansas
St. Louis, Iron Mountain and Southern Railway
Pine Bluff
Tourist attractions in Pine Bluff, Arkansas
Transportation in Jefferson County, Arkansas
Pine Bluff, Arkansas
Railway stations in the United States opened in 1906
Former railway stations in Arkansas
Individually listed contributing properties to historic districts on the National Register in Arkansas